Shoshana Nyree Johnson (born January 18, 1973) is a Panamanian-born former United States soldier, and the first black female prisoner of war in the military history of the United States. Johnson was a Specialist of the U.S. Army 507th Maintenance Company, 5/52 ADA BN, 11th ADA Brigade.  

During the Battle of Nasiriyah, she suffered bullet wounds to both of her ankles and was captured by Iraqi forces. She was held prisoner in Iraq for 22 days along with five other members of her unit. She was freed in a rescue mission conducted by United States Marine Corps units on April 13, 2003.

Life and career
Johnson, a second-generation U.S. Army veteran, is a native of Panama. She moved to the United States with her family when she was a child. She is the eldest child of retired Army Sergeant First Class Claude Johnson and wife Eunice. In 1991, Johnson was in the JROTC program at Andress High School. Although she did not plan a career in the military, she wanted to attend culinary school, so she joined the Army to save money for tuition. She joined the US Army in September 1998 after dropping out of University of Texas at El Paso (UTEP).

In February 2003, while serving her second military assignment at Fort Bliss, Texas, Johnson received orders to deploy to Iraq as a Quartermaster Corps Food Service Specialist (MOS 92G) with the 507th Maintenance Company, 5/52 ADA BN, 11th ADA Brigade. Shoshana enlisted with the duty of preparing meals.  Her company's duty was to supply mechanics to repair the Patriot missile trucks housed at the post.

On March 23, 2003, one month after her arrival to serve as part of Operation Iraqi Freedom, Johnson was in a convoy that was ambushed and taken captive in the city of Nasiriyah. Iraqi troops ambushed her supply convoy when it took a wrong turn. There had been bitter fighting around Nasiriyah, a vital crossing point of the River Euphrates. Johnson was among a dozen soldiers in the convoy who were captured. She received a bullet wound to her ankles.

Iraqi authorities broadcast video of Johnson, shortly after her capture.
CNN described this video as when "Americans were first introduced to Johnson".

On April 13, 2003, after subsequent house raids conducted by United States Marines of the 3rd Light Armored Reconnaissance Battalion, 1st Marine Division in the city of Samarra, Johnson was rescued along with six other prisoners of war. They were welcomed as heroes in the United States on April 16 with a cheering crowd of over 3,000 people. The U.S. Army recognized them for courage, valor, and service with several awards.

On December 12, 2003, Johnson left the U.S. Army on a Temporary Disability Honorable Discharge. Johnson was awarded the Bronze Star, Purple Heart and the Prisoner of War Medal for her service in Iraq and has received numerous awards and recognition for her courage, valor, and service to the United States. On New Year's Eve 2003, Johnson was asked to join New York City mayor Michael Bloomberg in activating the Times Square New Year ball drop to ring in 2004.

Controversy
Critics have accused the military and media of racism in that they focused attention on Jessica Lynch, a white woman, rather than Johnson, a black woman. CNN reported that "Lynch got a million-dollar book deal and more in disability payments from the military than Johnson. Some said it was a long standing and well documented issue of race in the military. Shoshana Johnson says reports that she and Lynch were at odds aren't true."

Book deal
Johnson signed a book deal with Dafina Books to write her story with Paul T. Brown, titled One Wrong Turn, which was to tell her side of the story and more about her fallen comrades.

In 2007, Dafina Books and Johnson parted ways. Johnson signed a deal with Simon & Schuster in 2008. I'm Still Standing: From Captive U.S. Soldier to Free Citizen — My Journey Home was released on February 2, 2010.

Awards and decorations

See also
 Battle of Nasiriyah

References

External links
 

1973 births
Living people
African-American female military personnel
Panamanian emigrants to the United States
United States Army personnel of the Iraq War
American prisoners of war
Iraq War prisoners of war
Logistics personnel of the United States military
People from El Paso, Texas
United States Army soldiers
University of Texas at El Paso alumni
Women in the Iraq War
Women in the United States Army
Zonians
Prisoners of war held by Iraq
21st-century American women
African-American United States Army personnel